Salix athabascensis is a species of willow first described by Hugh Miller Raup.

Range
It is found in fens, bogs, and treed bogs; from 0–1800 meters in Alberta, British Columbia, Manitoba, the Northwest Territories, Saskatchewan, Yukon, and Alaska.

References 

athabascensis
Flora of Subarctic America
Species described in 1930